William Campbell James Meredith  (1904–1960), often referred to as W. C. J. Meredith, was a Canadian lawyer, the author of three legal texts, and Dean of the McGill University Faculty of Law (1950–1960). In 1951, he was noted for the prescient hiring of John Cobb Cooper to head up the new department he created, McGill's Institute of Air Space Law.

Meredith was born on February 6, 1904, in Montreal, Quebec, the only son of Frederick Edmund Meredith and Anne Madeleine VanKoughnet. The jurist William Collis Meredith was his grandfather. He was educated in England at Summer Fields School; Wellington College, Berkshire; and, Trinity College, Cambridge. He also studied for a year at the University of Grenoble in France. Considered an expert in litigation, he became a senior partner in his father's law firm and was made a King's Counsel in 1942. He was selected by the government to be the special federal prosecutor at the trial of Fred Rose. He was governor of Selwyn House School and Bishop's University. In 1950, John Wilson McConnell, Governor of McGill University, persuaded him to take up the position of Dean at Law at McGill. He held this position until his death.

In 1935, he married Marie-Berthe-Louise-Francoise Martin. They were the parents of one son, but divorced 14 November 1949, by a private act of Parliament. Privately, he was an amateur radio enthusiast who enjoyed tennis and skiing and had in his early years been a member of the Montreal Hunt. He died in 1960 in Montreal, and is buried at Mount Royal Cemetery. The Meredith Memorial Lectures at McGill University are named in his memory.

Bibliography
"Insanity as a Criminal Defence" (Wilson & Lafleur, 1931)
"Civil Law on Automobile Accidents, Quebec" (Wilson & Lafleur, 1940)
"Malpractice Liability of Doctors and Hospitals: Common Law and Quebec Law" (Carswell Company, 1956)

References

External links
 Book on Insanity as a Criminal Defence, Edmonton Journal, April 16, 1931
Meredith Memorial Lectures

1904 births
1960 deaths
20th-century Canadian lawyers
20th-century scholars
Academics from Montreal
Alumni of Trinity College, Cambridge
Amateur radio people
Burials at Mount Royal Cemetery
Canadian King's Counsel
Canadian legal scholars
Deans of law schools in Canada
Lawyers in Quebec
Academic staff of the McGill University Faculty of Law
Scholars of criminal law
Scholars of medical law
Scholars of tort law